Mantoudi is a village in the municipal unit of Kireas, Euboea, Greece. Since the 2010 local government reform, it is part of the municipality Mantoudi-Limni-Agia Anna. It was the seat of the former municipality Kireas between 1997 and 2010. In 2011 its population was 1,787. It is situated 4 km from the northeast coast of Euboea, on the river Kireas.

See also

List of settlements in the Euboea regional unit

References

Populated places in Euboea (regional unit)
Populated places in Euboea